The 2020–21 season was NK Lokomotiva's 107th season in existence and the club's 12th consecutive season in the top flight of Croatian football. In addition to the domestic league, Lokomotiva competed in this season's edition of the Croatian Football Cup, the UEFA Champions League and the UEFA Europa League. The season covers the period from 1 July 2020 to 30 June 2021.

Players

Current squad

Out on loan

Transfers

In

Out

Pre-season and friendlies

Competitions

Overview

HT Prva liga

League table

Results summary

Results by round

Matches

Croatian Football Cup

UEFA Champions League

UEFA Europa League

Statistics

Goalscorers

References

External links

NK Lokomotiva Zagreb seasons
Lokomotiva